Emmett Naar (born 3 July 1994) is an Australian professional basketball player who plays for the Heroes Den Bosch of the BNXT League. He primarily plays as point guard. He competed in U.S. college basketball for the Saint Mary's Gaels.

College career
His junior career was played in Northern Suburbs Basketball Association competition in Sydney. From January 2012 to July 2013, he was a basketball scholarship athlete at the Australian Institute of Sport in Canberra. Naar joined Saint Mary's just before classes started in 2013 and redshirted his first year. Naar had a strong sophomore year, averaging 14.0 points and 6.4 assists per game. As a junior, Naar was an Honorable Mention All-West Coast Conference selection. He averaged 9.4 points, 2.4 rebounds, and 5.6 assists per game and shot 42.4% from behind the arc. Naar was named to the First-team All-West Coast Conference as a senior while his teammate Jock Landale was named conference player of the year. He averaged 9.5 points and 7.9 assists per game as a senior. He broke the school’s all-time assist record formerly held by NBA guard Matthew Dellavedova.

Professional career

Illawarra Hawks (2018–2022) 
On 2 May 2018, Naar signed a three-year deal with the Illawarra Hawks. He re-signed with the Illawarra Hawks on 15 July 2020.

Heroes Den Bosch (2022–present) 
On 1 August 2022, Naar signed a one-year deal with Heroes Den Bosch of the Dutch BNXT League.

International career
Naar competed for Australia in the 2013 FIBA Under-19 World Championship in Prague. He averaged 8.8 points, 2.6 rebounds, and 2.4 assists on the fourth-place team. His best game was a 20-point outing versus China. Naar was named to the Australian roster at the 2017 World University Games.

Naar plays for the Australian senior team since 2022.

References

External links
St. Mary's Gaels bio

1994 births
Living people
Australian expatriate basketball people in the United States
Australian Institute of Sport basketball players
Australian men's basketball players
Basketball players from Sydney
Canterbury Rams players
Heroes Den Bosch players
Illawarra Hawks players
People educated at Sydney Boys High School
Point guards
Saint Mary's Gaels men's basketball players
Sportspeople from Canberra